Chevrolet small-block engine refers to one of a number of gasoline-powered vehicle engines manufactured by General Motors. These include:

 The first or second generation of non-LS Chevrolet small-block engines,
 The third, fourth, or fifth generation of LS-based GM engines, or
 The Chevrolet Gemini small-block engine.